Sootaguse may refer to several places in Estonia:
Sootaguse, Kadrina Parish, village in Lääne-Viru County, Estonia
Sootaguse, Vinni Parish, village in Lääne-Viru County, Estonia
Sootaguse, Väike-Maarja Parish, village in Lääne-Viru County, Estonia